Oskars Melbārdis (born 16 February 1988) is a former Latvian bobsledder who has competed since 2006. He is the most successful bobsledder in the history of his country, having won one gold and two bronze Olympic medals. He also earned the first-ever gold medal for Latvia at World Championships in Igls, preceded by one silver and two bronze medals in 2009-2015.

Career review
Melbārdis started his career as a brakeman, most notably competing along Jānis Miņins, however starting from 2010–11 season Melbārdis has been competing as a pilot. He won a gold medal in the four-man event at the FIBT World Championships 2016 in Igls, Austria with teammates Daumants Dreiškens, Arvis Vilkaste and Jānis Strenga. It was the first ever World Championships gold medal in bobsled for Latvia.

He won a silver medal in the two-man event at the FIBT World Championships 2015 in Winterberg and two bronze medals in the four-man events at the FIBT World Championships 2009 in Lake Placid, New York and at the FIBT World Championships 2015.

He won a gold medal at the 2014 Winter Olympics in the four-man event in Sochi and won a bronze medal in the two-man event.

He won Bobsleigh European Championship four-man events in 2008 and 2015 and finished 3rd in the four-man event in 2016 and 2018. 
Melbārdis also finished 2nd in the two-man event in the 2015 Bobsleigh European Championship.

Melbārdis won a combined Bobsleigh World Cup title in 2012–13 and 2014–15. He won two-man and four-man World Cup titles in 2014–15 when he had 15 (from 16) podium finishes in two-man and four-man events, including seven first places.

Highlights

Bob-Pilot

(Not complete list of results)

World Championships
2016 – Igls, 1st  at 4-bob
2015 – Winterberg, 2nd  at 2-bob
2015 – Winterberg, 3rd  at 4-bob
2013 – St. Moritz, 5th at 2-bob with Dreiškens
2013 – St. Moritz, 9th at 4-bob with Dreiškens / Vilkaste / Strenga
2012 – Lake Placid, 8th at 2-bob with Dreiškens

World Cup
2013/14 – Igls, 1st  at 4-bob with Dreiškens / Vilkaste / Strenga
2013/14 – St. Moritz, 1st  at 4-bob with Dreiškens / Vilkaste / Strenga
2012/13 – Sochi, 1st  at 4-bob with Dreiškens / Vilkaste / Strenga
2012/13 – Sochi, 3rd  at 2-bob with Dreiškens
2012/13 – Königssee, 2nd  at 2-bob with Dreiškens
2012/13 – Winterberg, 3rd  at 4-bob Dreiškens / Vilkaste / Strenga
2012/13 – Park City, 4th at 2-bob with Dreiškens
2011/12 – Calgary, 4th at 4-bob with Lūsis / Vilkaste / Strenga
2011–12 – Königssee, 4th at 4-bob with Lūsis / Vilkaste / Strenga
2011/12 – Winterberg, 3rd  at 4-bob with Lūsis / Vilkaste / Strenga
2011/12 – Winterberg, 3rd  at 2-bob with Dreiškens
2011/12 – Igls, 4th at 2-bob with Dreiškens

European Championships
2015 – La Plagne, 1st  at 4-bob
2015 – La Plagne 2nd  at 2-bob

Junior World Championships
2012 – Igls, 1st  at 2-bob with Strenga
2012 – Igls, 1st  at 4-bob with Lūsis / Vilkaste / Strenga

Brakeman

World Championships
2009 – Lake Placid, 3rd  at 4-bob with Miņins / Dreiškens / Dambis

World Cup
2009/10 – Park City, 2nd  at 4-bob with Miņins / Dreiškens / Dambis

2008/09 – Park City, 2nd  at 4-bob with Miņins / Dreiškens / Dambis
2008–09 – Park City, 2nd  at 4-bob with Miņins / Dreiškens / Dambis
2008/09 – Whistler, 1st  at 4-bob with Miņins / Dreiškens / Dambis
2008/09 – Königssee, 3rd  at 4-bob with Miņins / Dreiškens / Dambis
2007/08 – Winterberg, 3rd  at 4-bob with Miņins / Dreiškens / Dambis
2007/08 – St. Moritz, 1st  at 4-bob with Miņins / Dreiškens / Dambis
2007/08 – Cesana, 1st  at 4-bob with Miņins / Dreiškens / Dambis

European Championships
2008 – Cesana, 1st  at 4-bob with Miņins / Dreiškens / Dambis

Career results

Olympic Games  
3 medals (1 gold, 2 bronze)

Bobsleigh World Cup

Season titles
4 globes (2 overall, 1 two-man, 1 four-man)

Two-man

Four-man

References

External links

Living people
1988 births
People from Valmiera
Latvian male bobsledders
Bobsledders at the 2014 Winter Olympics
Bobsledders at the 2018 Winter Olympics
Olympic bobsledders of Latvia
Olympic medalists in bobsleigh
Olympic gold medalists for Latvia 
Olympic bronze medalists for Latvia
Medalists at the 2014 Winter Olympics
Medalists at the 2018 Winter Olympics